Ilario Iotti (born 10 May 1995) is an Italian professional footballer who plays as a winger for  club Pro Vercelli.

Club career
Formed as a player in Ascoli Calcio, Iotti made his first team and Serie C1 debut on 22 September 2013 against L'Aquila.

After he was send on loan to Serie D clubs Matelica and Fermana for the next two seasons.

On 15 June 2017, he left Ascoli and signed for Fermana. He spend four seasons for his new club, and plays more than 100 matches for the team.

On 23 July 2021, he joined to Pro Vercelli on exchange for Simone Moschin. On 31 August 2021, he was loaned to Triestina.

References

External links
 
 

1995 births
Living people
People from Ascoli Piceno
Sportspeople from the Province of Ascoli Piceno
Italian footballers
Association football wingers
Serie C players
Serie D players
Ascoli Calcio 1898 F.C. players
S.S. Matelica Calcio 1921 players
Fermana F.C. players
F.C. Pro Vercelli 1892 players
U.S. Triestina Calcio 1918 players
Footballers from Marche